The HTC Desire C (codenamed Golfu (GSM) or Golfc (CDMA)) is an Android smartphone manufactured by HTC. An entry-level device, the Desire C is patterned off other low-end HTC phones such as the Explorer and Wildfire S with 512 MB of RAM and a 600 MHz processor, but with features from recent HTC devices such as the One X including a similar design, Android 4.0 and Sense 4.0a, Beats Audio, and support for NFC.The Desire C is available in three different color schemesblack, white, and red.

Availability 
The HTC Desire C was released on several carriers in the United Kingdom in June 2012, such as 3, T-Mobile and Orange. In July 2012, Virgin Mobile and SaskTel became the first Canadian carriers to offer the Desire C.

The Desire C is also available on Cricket Wireless in the US, with a 1 GHz processor and CDMA technology instead of GSM.

Model variants 
There are model variants of HTC Desire C:

 H1000C  - CDMA variant for Cricket Wireless
 PL01100 - Europe/Asia A320e variant
 PL01110 - A320eN variant with NFC
 PL01120 - Unknown GSM variant?
 PL01130 - Americas A320a variant
 PL01140 - China A320c variant
 PL01150 - Australian A320b variant
 PL01200 - CDMA variant for Cricket Wireless (Cricket Muve)
 PL01210 - Unknown CDMA variant?

References

Desire C
Android (operating system) devices
Mobile phones introduced in 2012
Discontinued smartphones
Mobile phones with user-replaceable battery

de:HTC Desire#Desire C